Andre Coleman (born July 26, 1984) is a former American football and a Canadian football defensive end. He was signed by the Chargers as an undrafted free agent in 2007. He played college football at Albany. Coleman is now a coach at Serra High School (San Diego, CA).

Early years
Coleman attended Burgard Vocational High School in Buffalo, New York and was a letterman in football, baseball, and bowling. In football, he was an All-Western New York selection and a Class C All-State second-team selection. He shattered school record with 18 sacks and totaled 88 tackles, five forced fumbles and three fumble recoveries as a senior captain. He also played tight end and fullback andught two touchdown passes and scored three 2-point conversions.

College career
As a senior, he earned First-team Mid-Major All-America honors as senior. He finished career with 110 tackles, 14 sacks and 35 tackles for loss he was named First-team All-Northeast Conference last season and one of two defensive linemen with 30-plus tackles Has earned three varsity letters. In 2005, he was named squad's top defensive lineman in leading a unit that ranked 11th nationally in scoring against (17.6 points/ game) and tied for first on the team with 4.5 sacks and was second on team with 12.0 tackles for a loss. In 2004, he made 22 tackles, including four for losses as a junior. In 2003, he appeared in all 11 games and made 14 tackles, including 3.0 sacks, and had two pass deflections.

Professional career

San Diego Chargers
He was signed by the Chargers as an undrafted free agent in 2007.

After being placed on the Chargers practice squad before week one in 2009 he was activated for the Monday Night game against the Oakland Raiders on September 14.

Coleman was later released by the Chargers to make room for veteran defensive tackle Alfonso Boone

External links
Just Sports Stats
Albany Great Danes bio
San Diego Chargers bio

1984 births
Living people
Albany Great Danes football players
American football defensive tackles
American football defensive ends
Edmonton Elks players
Sportspeople from Buffalo, New York
Players of American football from Buffalo, New York
San Diego Chargers players